John Michael Botean (born  July 9, 1955) is an American prelate of the Romanian Greek Catholic Church. Since 1996 he has been eparch in the Romanian Catholic Eparchy of St. George, the second to hold that position in the United States' sole Romanian Byzantine Catholic eparchy and the only Romanian Rite eparchy outside of Romania.

Biography
Botean was born on July 9, 1955, in Canton, Ohio, to a Romanian-American couple, John and Amelia Botean (née Popa). He has one younger brother, Mark S. Botean. He was ordained a priest on May 18, 1986. In 1993 he was appointed apostolic administrator for the diocese and then eparch on March 29, 1996. He was consecrated a bishop on August 24 that year by Archbishop Lucian Mureșan, assisted by co-consecrators Archbishop Judson Michael Procyk and Bishop Nicholas James Samra.

As the second eparch in the history of a unique eparchy, a large part of Botean's activities consist of compliance work, bringing the organization into conformance with the requirements of his split jurisdiction, both American and Romanian. Most of his parishes long predate the creation of the eparchy, often by many decades. The first mission established during the lifetime of the diocese to be raised to the level of a parish was raised on June 29, 2008.

In 2005 Botean established traditional Romanian Byzantine Catholic monasticism in the Diocese of Canton with the transfer of Holy Resurrection Monastery to diocesan jurisdiction. On October 17, 2006, the Holy Theophany Monastery for women (nuns) was established as a dependency of Holy Resurrection Monastery under the Botean's jurisdiction.

In his 2003 Lenten pastoral letter, Botean spoke out against the Iraq War. The letter was a direct condemnation of the conflict, and termed it "objectively grave evil, a matter of mortal sin". This was the most outspoken language used by a United States Catholic bishop or eparch about the war. No other United States ordinary directly condemned the Iraq war.

On June 28, 2008, Botean called the eparchial assembly to meet. It was the first serious effort to convoke the eparchial assembly in conformance with the 1990 Code of Canons of the Eastern Churches (Canons 235-242) during Botean's episcopacy. This preliminary session focused on organizing issues. At that meeting the practice of yearly assemblies was announced, and the next was held at St. Basil's in Trenton, New Jersey, in June 2009.

Botean is a member of the United States Conference of Catholic Bishops (USCCB) and also the Romanian Catholic Synod. He is in the unusual position of being directly answerable to the Pope and not to his synod. This odd position is a consequence of the very real modern development of understanding between viewing the Church as one with different rites within it and the Universal Church uniting 24 different sui iuris churches. The present situation of the eparchy is a midpoint between the two, within the newly formed Romanian synod and within the USCCB, but not answerable either.

References

Additional sources

External links

Eparchy of St. George in Canton

1955 births
Living people
American Eastern Catholic bishops
Romanian Greek-Catholic bishops
American people of Romanian descent
People from Canton, Ohio
Stances and opinions regarding the Iraq War